"Ecstasy" is a song by British electronic music duo Disclosure. It was released as the lead single from the duo's eighth EP of the same name, and second single from their third studio album Energy on 24 February 2020.

Background
In a statement, Guy and Howard Lawrence said, "This song came into existence early 2019 during a writing session at Guy's house in London. We were curiously chopping up samples from various Seventies disco and soul records when suddenly, Fantasy by Aquarian Dream gave us the exact thing we were searching for. This song is made entirely to get a human being to their feet and directly to the dance floor."

Personnel
Credits adapted from Tidal.
 Guy Lawrence – producer, composer, lyricist, associated performer, mixer, programming, studio personnel
 Howard Lawrence – producer, composer, lyricist, associated performer, programming
 Claude Bartlee – composer, lyricist
 Gloria Jones – composer, lyricist
 Jacques Burvick – composer, lyricist
 Patrica Shannon – composer, lyricist
 Stuart Hawkes – mastering engineer, studio personnel

Track listing
Tracks and metadata adapted from iTunes. All tracks produced by Disclosure.

Charts

Release history

References

2020 songs
2020 singles
Disclosure (band) songs
Songs written by Gloria Jones
Songs written by Guy Lawrence
Songs written by Howard Lawrence